Marshall Clagett (January 23, 1916, Washington, D.C. – October 21, 2005, Princeton, New Jersey) was an American historian of science who specialized in medieval science.  John Murdoch describes him as "a distinguished medievalist" who was "the last member of a triumvirate [with Henry Guerlac and I. Bernard Cohen, who] … established the history of science as a recognized discipline within American universities" while Edward Grant ranks him "among the greatest historians and scholars of the twentieth century."

Career
Clagett began his undergraduate education in 1933 at the California Institute of Technology. In 1935 he transferred to George Washington University, there completing his bachelor's degree and in 1937 his master's degree. He then studied history at Columbia University with Lynn Thorndike, receiving his Ph.D. in 1941.  After obtaining his degree he entered the US Navy as an ensign and, having served in the Pacific and on Okinawa, was discharged in 1946 with the rank of lieutenant commander.

After one year at Columbia University as an instructor in history and the history of science, Clagett joined the University of Wisconsin's Department of History of Science, eventually becoming Vilas Research Professor there. From 1959 to 1964, he was also director of the University's Institute for Research in the Humanities.  At Wisconsin he organized an influential conference on Critical Problems in the History of Science and edited the resulting seminal volume of papers.

Clagett held two visiting appointments (1958–59 and 1963) at the School of Historical Studies of the Institute for Advanced Study in Princeton, New Jersey and in 1964 he was appointed permanently to the faculty of the School of Historical Studies.

He wrote more than a dozen volumes on the history of science, many of them focusing on the role of mathematics in natural philosophy and
on pure mathematics.  Clagett became Professor Emeritus in 1986, continued research and writing, completing three of the planned four volumes of Ancient Egyptian Science.

Honors 

He was honored with the following prizes:
 1960, the Pfizer Award of the History of Science Society for his Science of Mechanics in the Middle Ages; 
 1969, the Charles Homer Haskins Medal of the Medieval Academy of America;
 1980, the George Sarton Medal of the History of Science Society;
 1981, the John Frederick Lewis Prize of the American Philosophical Society, and the Alexandre Koyré Medal of the International Academy of the History of Science, for his Archimedes in the Middle Ages;
 1989, the Lewis Prize again for Ancient Egyptian Science, Vol. I;
 1995, one of two newly created Giovanni Dondi dall'Orologio European Prizes in the History of Science, Technology, and Industry, given in recognition of a lifetime of scholarship in the history of science;
 1996, the 35th annual International Galileo Galilei Prize, given by the Award Foundation of the Italian Rotary for outstanding contributions by a foreign scholar to the study and diffusion of Italian culture.

A fellow of the Medieval Academy of America and past president of the History of Science Society, he was a member and former vice president of the American Philosophical Society. He was also a member of the Deutsche Gesellschaft für Geschichte der Medizin, Naturwissenschaft und Technik, and the International Academy of the History of Science, which he served as vice president from 1968 to 1971.

Selected publications

 1953 - "Medieval Latin Translations from the Arabic of the Elements of Euclid, with Special Emphasis on the Versions of Adelard of Bath," Isis 44: 16–42.
 1955 - Greek Science in Antiquity. New York: Abelard-Schuman, 1955, Revised edition, New York: Collier Books, 1963.
 1959 - The Science of Mechanics in the Middle Ages. Madison, WI: University of Wisconsin Press.
 1959 - (ed.) Critical Problems in the History of Science. Madison, WI: University of Wisconsin Press.
 1959 - "The Impact of Archimedes on Medieval Science," Isis 50: 419–429. Reprinted in The Scientific Enterprise in Antiquity and the Middle Ages, ed. Michael H. Shank, Chicago: University of Chicago Press, 2000, pp. 337–347.
 1961 - (ed. with Gaines Post and Robert Reynolds) Twelfth-Century Europe and the Foundations of Modern Society. Madison, WI: University of Wisconsin Press.
 1964-84 - Archimedes in the Middle Ages, 5 vols in 10 tomes. Madison, WI: University of Wisconsin Press, 1964; Philadelphia: American Philosophical Society, 1967–1984.
 1968 - Nicole Oresme and the Medieval Geometry of Qualities and Motions. Madison, WI: University of Wisconsin Press.
 1989-99 - Ancient Egyptian Science: A Source Book, 3 vols. Philadelphia: American Philosophical Society.

Notes

References

 

Historians of science
University of Wisconsin–Madison faculty
Institute for Advanced Study faculty
1916 births
2005 deaths
People from Washington, D.C.
Columbia Graduate School of Arts and Sciences alumni
Fellows of the Medieval Academy of America
United States Navy personnel of World War II
United States Navy officers